The Changeover: a Supernatural Romance is a low fantasy novel for young adults by Margaret Mahy, published in 1984 by J. M. Dent in the U.K. It is set in Christchurch in the author's native New Zealand.

Mahy and The Changeover won the annual Carnegie Medal from the Library Association, recognising the year's best children's book by a British subject. Thus she became the fourth writer with two such honours (of seven through 2012), having won the 1982 Medal for The Haunting.

Atheneum Books published a U.S. edition within the year.

WorldCat reports that The Changeover is Mahy's novel most widely held in participating libraries, second among all her works behind a picture book collaboration, The Seven Chinese Brothers (1989).

Plot introduction 

The Changeover is set in a fairly new suburb of Christchurch called Gardendale; Mahy had renamed the suburb of Bishopdale for her book. It has a fairy-tale plot, with a devoted sister risking her life to save her bewitched brother. In some respects a coming-of-age story, it is also an unconventional romance between an aloof and difficult boy who happens to be a male witch and a strong-willed, psychically sensitive schoolgirl.

Plot summary 

Laura Chant has one of her "warnings", a premonition that something is about to happen, but is forced to ignore it and go to school as usual. On the way home, she and her younger brother Jacko encounter the sinister Carmody Braque, who 'playfully' stamps Jacko's hand, the stamp appearing as an image of his face.

As Jacko becomes increasingly ill, Laura believes he has been possessed. She seeks the help of Sorensen "Sorry" Carlisle, recognized by her as a witch in hiding though to others he seems just a painfully well-behaved school prefect who photographs birds as a hobby. She learns that Braque is an ancient being who consumes the life force of others to keep himself alive. Sorry's grandmother Winter, one of a long line of witches, recommends that Laura should "changeover" from her normal life, to become a witch or "woman of the moon" herself. She would then be in a position to trick an unwary Braque into putting himself in her power. Although warned that the changeover can be dangerous, Laura is determined to save her brother, now very near death.

Laura experiences the changeover as a spirit journey through a dark forest, which is also at the same time Gardendale. The Carlisle witches help her through it, for their own reasons, and she emerges from the perilous passage with the power of nature and imagination awakened in her.

Taking Sorensen along to mask her new power, Laura confronts Braque and succeeds in gaining power over him and breaking his hold on Jacko. At first intending to make the evil entity suffer, she rejects the dark temptation and instead ends his unnatural existence.

Characters 

 Laura Chant, a 14-year-old schoolgirl who lives in Gardendale, a suburb of Christchurch, and is sensitive to the supernatural
 Jacko Chant, Laura's 3-year-old brother
 Kate Chant, Laura's mother, manager of a bookshop in the Gardendale Mall
 Stephen Chant, Laura and Jacko's father, who lives in the north
 Julia Chant, Stephen's new wife, pregnant with their first child
 Mrs Fangboner, Jacko's babysitter
 Chris Holly, Kate's new boyfriend, first seen as a customer at the bookshop, a Canadian librarian working at the Christchurch Central Library
 Sorensen Carlisle, known as Sorry, an 18-year-old prefect at Laura's school, a male witch. Fostered as a baby, he returned to the Carlisle home aged 16
 Miryam Carlisle, Sorenson's mother, a witch
 Winter Carlisle, Miryam's mother, a witch
 Carmody Braque, a vampiric lemur masquerading as an antique dealer

Literary significance and reception 

The novel was awarded the Carnegie Medal for 1984 and was also the ALA Best Book for Young Adults, the School Library Journal Best Book of the Year, the Booklist Editor's Choice and a Boston Globe-Horn Honour Book.

It was described by The Guardian as "a seamless combination of supernatural thriller and entirely authentic teenage story", and by the School Library Journal as "an extraordinarily rich and sensitive novel" with a beautiful but ornate style. In the re-release of the novel in 2007, the author notes the book's significance as having been both her first young adult novel and the first in which she effectively evoked the New Zealand setting. She also observes its lack of adolescent idiom, which gives it a timeless quality. It is recommended by several reading books, particularly for teenage girls.

The Changeover has been the subject of scholarly essays, especially dealing with its fairy tale elements.

Film adaptation
A film based on the novel, starring Timothy Spall, Melanie Lynskey, Lucy Lawless, Nicholas Galitzine, Erana James, Benji Purchase, Kate Harcourt and Thomasin McKenzie was released in September 2017. The film was shot in Christchurch in 2016. The adaptation was given four-out-of-four stars by Matt Zoller Seitz, stating that "[i]t's creepy, moving, and ultimately inspirational, and its more disturbing images stick in the mind.... In its own modest way, this is a perfect genre film."

References

External links
 —immediately, first US edition 

Young adult novels
20th-century New Zealand novels
New Zealand children's books
Novels set in New Zealand
New Zealand speculative fiction works
Carnegie Medal in Literature winning works
1984 children's books
J. M. Dent books
1984 novels
Christchurch in fiction
Books by Margaret Mahy